Walter Kaiser may refer to:

Walter Kaiser (footballer), German footballer
Walter Kaiser Jr., (born 1933), American evangelical Old Testament scholar, writer, public speaker, and educator
Walter Kaiser (rower) (born 1971), Austrian Olympic rower